John "Barry" Salovaara (born  January 7, 1948) is a Canadian retired professional ice hockey player who played 90 games in the National Hockey League for the Detroit Red Wings during the 1974–75 and 1975–76 seasons. The rest of his career, which lasted from 1968 to 1979, was mainly spent in the minor leagues.

Career statistics

Regular season and playoffs

External links
 

1948 births
Living people
Baltimore Clippers players
Canadian ice hockey defencemen
Dallas Black Hawks players
Detroit Red Wings players
Fort Worth Wings players
Greensboro Generals (EHL) players
EC KAC players
KOOVEE players
New Haven Nighthawks players
Ice hockey people from Toronto
St. Catharines Black Hawks players
Tidewater Wings players
Virginia Wings players